Georges Robert Félix Constant Leuillieux (3 August 1879 – 1 May 1950) was a French freestyle swimmer and water polo player. He competed at the 1900 Summer Olympics in water polo and four swimming events. He won a bronze medal in the 200 m team swimming and finished sixth in the 1000 m freestyle events.

References

External links
 

1879 births
1950 deaths
Sportspeople from Lille
French male freestyle swimmers
Swimmers at the 1900 Summer Olympics
Water polo players at the 1900 Summer Olympics
Olympic bronze medalists for France
Olympic bronze medalists in swimming
Olympic swimmers of France
Olympic water polo players of France
Medalists at the 1900 Summer Olympics
French male water polo players
19th-century French people
20th-century French people
French male backstroke swimmers
French male long-distance swimmers